In the 1938–39 season, USM Blida is competing in the First Division for the 6th season French colonial era, as well as the Forconi Cup, and the North African Cup.

Pre-season

Competitions

Overview

First Division

Play-off

North African Cup

League table

Group A

Results summary

Results by round

Squad statistics
DF: Ripoll, Allègre, El Aid, Ali Mansouri as Ali Doudou (ASB), Farès Mohamed
MF: Mellal, Khaldi, Chekaimi Ali (FCB), Sylvestre
FW: Benelfoul Mohamed (ASB), Ardjem Kaddour (ASB), Négro, Haten, Benelfoul Ahmed + Hamidouche Ali

References

External links

USM Blida seasons
Algerian football clubs 1938–39 season